Heidi Lüdi (born 1949) is a Swiss art director known for her work in New German Cinema. She is married to fellow set designer Toni Lüdi with whom she has often collaborated.

Selected filmography
 The Glass Cell (1978)
 Knife in the Head (1978)
 In the Heart of the Hurricane (1980)
 The Magic Mountain (1982)
 Wings of Desire (1987)

References

Bibliography
Hans-Michael Bock and Tim Bergfelder. The Concise Cinegraph: An Encyclopedia of German Cinema. Berghahn Books, 2009.

External links

1949 births
Living people
German art directors
Swiss art directors
People from Basel-Stadt